Laakarta is a town in Safi Province, Marrakesh-Safi, Morocco. According to the 2004 census it has a population of 3,116.
Laakarta has a warm and temperate climate.

References

Populated places in Safi Province